Private Obsession is a 1995 American erotic thriller film written and directed by Lee Frost and starring Shannon Whirry, Michael Christian, and Bo Svenson.

Premise
A beautiful woman is kidnapped and imprisoned by an obsessed man.

References

External links

1995 films
1990s erotic thriller films
American erotic thriller films
1990s English-language films
1990s American films